Fyodor Metelkov (4 July 1934 – March 2013) was a Russian equestrian. He competed in the individual jumping event at the 1960 Summer Olympics.

References

External links
 

1934 births
2013 deaths
Russian male equestrians
Soviet male equestrians
Olympic equestrians of the Soviet Union
Equestrians at the 1960 Summer Olympics
People from Kostroma
Sportspeople from Kostroma Oblast